Tides is an album by American musician Kaitlyn Aurelia Smith, initially released in 2014  and later re-released on 11 January 2019 as Tides: Music for Meditation and Yoga through the label Touchtheplants.

Background and recording
Smith recorded the album in 2013 using a Buchla Music Easel synthesizer after her mother, a yoga teacher, wanted music she could play during her classes. It includes field recordings of "wind chimes, forest sounds, birds chirping, [and] steam valves". The album will be the first release on Smith's new label, Touchtheplants.

Critical reception
Fact said the album provides an "insight into an early phase of the composer[']s music".

Track listing
Adapted from Bandcamp.

References

2019 albums
Kaitlyn Aurelia Smith albums